Tiley is a surname. Notable people with the surname include:

Arthur Tiley (1910–1994), British Conservative and National Liberal politician
Brad Tiley (born 1971), Canadian retired professional ice hockey defenceman
Craig Tiley (born 1962), South African tennis executive and retired U.S college tennis coach
Roger Tiley, Welsh documentary photographer
Steven Tiley (born 1982), English professional golfer

See also
Tilley (disambiguation)
Tilley's
Tilney (disambiguation)